The South Louisiana Pipeliners were a minor-league baseball team based in Morgan City, Louisiana. The team played during the 2009 season in the Continental Baseball League.

References

Professional baseball teams in Louisiana
Baseball teams established in 2009
Baseball teams disestablished in 2009
Morgan City, Louisiana
2009 establishments in Louisiana
2009 disestablishments in Louisiana
Defunct independent baseball league teams
Defunct baseball teams in Louisiana